Buffalo Township may refer to:

Arkansas 
 Buffalo Township, Craighead County, Arkansas, in Craighead County, Arkansas

Illinois 

 Buffalo Township, Ogle County, Illinois

Iowa 

 Buffalo Township, Buchanan County, Iowa
 Buffalo Township, Kossuth County, Iowa
 Buffalo Township, Linn County, Iowa
 Buffalo Township, Scott County, Iowa
 Buffalo Township, Winnebago County, Iowa

Kansas 

 Buffalo Township, Barton County, Kansas
 Buffalo Township, Jewell County, Kansas
 Buffalo Township, Cloud County, Kansas

Minnesota 

 Buffalo Township, Wright County, Minnesota

Missouri 

 Buffalo Township, Dunklin County, Missouri
 Buffalo Township, Morgan County, Missouri
 Buffalo Township, Newton County, Missouri, in Newton County, Missouri
 Buffalo Township, Pike County, Missouri

Ohio 

 Buffalo Township, Noble County, Ohio

Oklahoma 

 Buffalo Township, in Beckham County, Oklahoma
 Buffalo Township, in Garfield County, Oklahoma
 Buffalo Township, in Harper County, Oklahoma
 Buffalo Township, in Latimer County, Oklahoma
 Buffalo Township, in Noble County, Oklahoma

Pennsylvania 

 Buffalo Township, Butler County, Pennsylvania
 Buffalo Township, Perry County, Pennsylvania
 Buffalo Township, Union County, Pennsylvania
 Buffalo Township, Washington County, Pennsylvania

Township name disambiguation pages